WMCA may refer to:

WMCA (AM), a radio station operating in New York City
West Midlands Combined Authority, the combined authority of the West Midlands metropolitan county in the United Kingdom
Wikimedia Canada, the official Canadian chapter of the Wikimedia Foundation